The Himsagar Mango is a popular mango cultivar, originating in the modern-day Bangladesh and state of West Bengal in India. Widely considered as the best mango, the inside of Himsagar is yellow to orange in colour and does not have any fibre. The fruit is medium-sized and weighs between 250 and 350 grams, out of which the pulp content is around 77%. It has a good keeping quality. It is also known as Khirsapati.

Himsagar ripens in May and it is available in the market from the second week of May to the end of June. It is mainly grown in the Chapai Nawabganj district of Bangladesh and the Malda, Murshidabad, Nadia, Hooghly districts of West Bengal, India. This cultivar is registered under the protected Geographical Indication index with G.I. Registration No. 112.

References 

Mango cultivars
Mango cultivars of India
Agriculture in West Bengal
Geographical indications in West Bengal